Landmark Cinema of Canada Inc. is a Canadian cinema chain. Based in Calgary, Alberta, Landmark operates 40 theatres with 325 screens, primarily in Ontario and western Canada. Its holdings include much of the former Empire Theatres chain which it acquired in late 2013, and some Famous Players locations divested as part of that chain's purchase by Cineplex Entertainment. Landmark is the second-largest cinema chain in Canada after Cineplex. It was acquired by Belgium company Kinepolis in 2017 for $123 million.

History
Landmark Cinemas is the umbrella name originally covering the holdings of Towne Cinemas, Rokemay Cinemas, and occasionally May Theatres.  It was adopted in 1974 after the purchase of Rothstein Theatres, which was the first big expansion for the company, adding about 15 locations (some closed immediately or sold and were never operated by Landmark).

Another expansion took place in 1984, when it purchased most of the Alberta and British Columbia assets of Canadian Odeon Theatres as  part of that chain's merger into Cineplex Odeon Corporation, now Cineplex Entertainment.

In late 2013, Landmark Cinemas announced the purchase of 23 theatres in Ontario and Western Canada from Empire Theatres. It later added the Kanata and Whitby locations that were to be sold to Cineplex Entertainment, plus Ottawa's World Exchange Plaza. This transaction made Landmark the second-largest cinema chain in Canada with 54 locations and 359 screens. The sale also included five IMAX screens in Calgary, Kitchener, Whitby, Kingston and Ottawa's Kanata location, and three Empire Extra screens in Calgary, Waterloo, and Ottawa's Orleans location. Empire promotional offers such as Reel Deal Tuesdays and University/College Student Combo were carried over by Landmark, but only some locations offer these discounts.

Empire Theatres in Ontario and Western Canada closed on October 31, 2013, after the evening shows which also closed Empire Theatres permanently. The sale closed on October 31, 2013, and on November 1, 2013, the theatres reopened as Landmark Cinemas. Branding name changes occurred in late 2013 at the former Empire Theatres locations.  Landmark Cinemas only operated the World Exchange Plaza theatre on a management contract for only two months in late 2013, from November 1 to December 31 when its lease expired.

In September 2017, Landmark announced its sale to the Belgian exhibitor Kinepolis for $123 million, pending regulatory approval. On December 8, 2017, Landmark announced the completion of the sale to Kinepolis Group.

Operations

Premium seating
Reserve Recline Relax is a premium theatre offering available at no additional charge at 19 Landmark Cinemas locations, plus one Edmonton location coming soon. Seats are reserved in advance and consist of larger, sofa-like chairs comparable to Cineplex VIP Cinemas, though without the legal drinking age requirement or alcohol service. To make room for these seats, theatres now have 60% fewer seats.

Premiere Seats consist of two different versions. The Cranbrook location has non recliner premiere style seating, while the Edmonton Tamarack locations has recliner premiere seats, which are similar to Landmarks other recliner seats but add privacy screens, coat hooks, side tables, plus adjustable headrests and heated seats.

Premium screens
Landmark Cinemas features several premium large format screens. These require an additional cost compared to a regular admission and offer reserved seating.
The company currently operates five digital IMAX screens. One is in Calgary, Alberta (Country Hills) and four are in Ontario at the Kingston, Kitchener, Kanata and Whitby locations. All of these were previously owned by Empire Theatres and, with the exception of Kingston, were in turn previously owned by AMC Theatres (Kanata and Whitby) or Famous Players (SilverCity in Calgary and Kitchener).
Extra Experience, formerly known as Empire Extra, is a large screen theatre concept debuted by Empire Theatres and acquired by Landmark. This technology is available at three locations: Orleans, Waterloo and Winnipeg (Grant Park 8). The technology was installed by Empire, with the exception of the Winnipeg location, where Landmark installed the technology in May 2015 and premiered Pitch Perfect 2 on Extra. These theatres use a Barco 2K projector, a custom-designed 7.1 surround sound system and faux leather seats.
Xtreme is available exclusively at the West Kelowna, BC location. It is a Landmark Cinemas brand similar to the Extra Experience, but in lieu of Extra's 7.1 surround sound, Xtreme uses Dolby Atmos (formerly Barco Auro 11.1) surround sound, and recliner seating.
Laser Ultra is available at the following locations; Surrey, New Westminster, Calgary Shawnessy, Calgary Market Mall, Calgary Country Hills, St. Albert, Edmonton Tamarack, Fort McMurray, Saskatoon, Regina, Brandon and St. Catharines.  These premium screens feature 4K laser projectors, Dolby Atmos surround sound, and recliner seating.

Locations

Former theatres

References

External links

Movie theatre chains in Canada
Companies based in Calgary
Entertainment companies established in 1965
1965 establishments in Alberta
2017 mergers and acquisitions
Canadian brands